Dream a Little Dream is a 1989 American fantasy-romantic comedy film directed by Marc Rocco and starring Corey Feldman, Corey Haim, Meredith Salenger, Jason Robards, Piper Laurie and Harry Dean Stanton. It was filmed in Wilmington, North Carolina.  This was the third film featuring The Two Coreys. A direct to video sequel, Dream a Little Dream 2, was released in 1994.

Plot
Bobby Keller is a slacker high school student who, while running through a short cut through a backyard in his neighborhood one night, collides with Lainie Diamond, over whom Bobby has recently been obsessing. During the collision, elderly professor Coleman Ettinger is performing a meditation exercise in the yard with his wife Gena, theorizing that if he and his wife can enter a meditative alpha state together voluntarily, they will be able to live together forever.  However, just as the Ettingers are on the verge of completing their meditation experiment, the teenagers' collision renders both teens unconscious, enacting a type of body switch between the four characters.

Bobby wakes up in his bedroom to find his best friend Dinger and his parents asking him if he's okay, but "Bobby" has no idea who these people are because he is actually Coleman trapped in Bobby Keller's body. Coleman leaves the house to find his wife but returns when he cannot find her or make any sense of the situation. On his return to Bobby's home, Coleman plays up the role of Bobby for his family and friend, just wanting to go to sleep to see if the alpha state he attains in dreams will give him any clue to what has gone wrong with the experiment.

In his dream, Coleman is greeted by the real Bobby, who appears to be trapped in a dream partially generated by Coleman's own subconscious. Coleman discovers that Gena, skeptical of her husband's "dream state" theory from the beginning, is also trapped in the dream but is unable to communicate with him because part of her mind has been transferred to Lainie's body. Bobby informs Coleman that he has very little time to prevent what's left of his wife from forgetting about him and becoming lost in the dream forever.

Bobby claims to know the secret to switch them all back, yet is reluctant to help Coleman do so, finding the dream-world he now inhabits to be more satisfying than the physical world in which he existed as a troubled teen. Coleman realizes he only has a few days (while pretending to be Bobby) to overcome generation gaps, high-school bullies, Lainie's violent and unstable boyfriend Joel, and Lainie's bitter and manipulative divorced mother in order to improve Bobby's grades, love-life, relationships with his family and friends, and connect with Lainie (who is not particularly fond of Bobby) enough to convince her to recreate the meditation experiment that might save his beloved wife.

Cast
Source

Music
The soundtrack includes a mix of 1980s rock and classic music. Michael Damian covered the 1973 David Essex song "Rock On" which rose to number 1 on the Billboard Hot 100 the week of June 3, 1989, helped by a video featuring the film's lead actors.

Mickey Thomas, the lead singer of the popular 1980s band Starship, recorded the film's title theme song and its duet version with Mel Tormé for the soundtrack. Thomas also appears as the teacher Mr. Pattison in the film.

Track listing
 "Dream a Little Dream of Me" by Mickey Thomas - (Fabian André; Gus Kahn; Wilbur Schwandt) – 2:52
 "Time Runs Wild" by Danny Wilde - (Danny Wilde) – 4:44
 "Whenever There's a Night" by Mike Reno - (John William Dexter; Tom Whitlock) – 3:34
 "Dreams Come True (Stand Up and Take It)" by Lone Justice - (Gregg Sutton; Maria McKee) – 4:05
 "Into the Mystic" by Van Morrison - (Van Morrison) – 3:30
 "It's the End of the World as We Know It (And I Feel Fine)" by R.E.M. - (Peter Buck; Mike Mills; Michael Stipe; Bill Berry) – 4:00
 "Rock On" by Michael Damian - (David Albert Cook) – 3:21
 "You'd Better Wait" by Fee Waybill - (Rick Neigher; James House) – 3:21
 "Never Turn Away" by Chris Thompson - (John William Dexter; Tom Whitlock) – 3:07
 "I've Got Dreams to Remember" by Otis Redding - (Otis Redding; Zelma Redding; Joe Rock) – 3:12
 "Dream a Little Dream of Me" by Mel Tormé & Mickey Thomas - (Fabian André; Gus Kahn; Wilbur Schwandt) – 2:51

Songs
 "Future's So Bright I Gotta Wear Shades" by Timbuk 3 - (Pat MacDonald)
 "Young At Heart" by Frank Sinatra - (Johnny Richards; Carolyn Leigh)
 "The Midnight Hour" by Wilson Pickett - (Wilson Pickett; Steve Cropper)
 "Where Is She?" by Blue Future - (Larry Weir)
 "Dress To Kill" by Steve Plunkett - (John William Dexter; Steve Plunkett)

Charts

Reception

Box office
The movie made $2,568,963 during its opening weekend, with its widest release, in 1,019 theaters. The following week, its weekend gross dropped dramatically (by around 51%). Its domestic gross came out to be around $5,500,000.

Critical response
The film received largely negative reviews, earning a 9% on Rotten Tomatoes based on all 11 reviews counted. On Metacritic, the film has a score of 32 out of 100, based on 12 critics.

References

External links
 
 
 

1989 films
1980s teen comedy films
American fantasy comedy films
American teen comedy films
1980s fantasy comedy films
Vestron Pictures films
Films directed by Marc Rocco
Films shot in North Carolina
Body swapping in films
1989 comedy films
1980s English-language films
1980s American films